Rapala scintilla, the scarce slate flash, is a species of lycaenid or blue butterfly found in the Indomalayan realm.

Subspecies
R. s. scintilla North India, Sikkim, Assam - Peninsular Malaya, Thailand 
R. s. nemana   Semper, 1890 Philippines (Mindanao)

References

Butterflies of Asia
Rapala (butterfly)
Butterflies described in 1890